"Shallow" is a single by British progressive rock band Porcupine Tree, released in 2005 and the first taken from the Deadwing album.

Background 
This single was released in January 2005 exclusively in the United States for radio broadcast purposes. The song managed to enter the Billboard's Hot Mainstream Rock Tracks chart, peaking at #26, without the help of any music video.

A European version of the single was first intended but rejected at the last minute, even though it had already started being manufactured. The band and their management asked to destroy all copies but a few made their way to the surface and were sold at some German and Polish stores. The management quickly bought all the remaining copies and sold them (signed only) at the shows for 40 Euro.

"Shallow" was featured in the movie and on the soundtrack for the film Four Brothers in which credits Colin Edwin curiously appears as Colin Balch; he is also credited under this name in the manuscript book for Deadwing.

Track listing

Personnel 
 Steven Wilson – vocals, guitars, piano, keyboards, hammered dulcimer
 Richard Barbieri – keyboards, synthesizers
 Colin Edwin – bass guitars
 Gavin Harrison – drums, percussion

Chart position

References 

2005 singles
Porcupine Tree songs
2005 songs
Songs written by Steven Wilson
Songs written by Richard Barbieri
Songs written by Colin Edwin
Songs written by Gavin Harrison